Alexander Mosely Pennock (November 1, 1813 – September 20, 1876) was an officer of the United States Navy during the American Civil War. He was a captain during the war and rose to the rank of rear admiral after the war.

Biography
Alexander Mosely Pennock was born in Norfolk, Virginia, on November 1, 1813.

He joined the United States Navy in April 1828. He was made a midshipman in 1834, commissioned as a lieutenant in March 1839, and as a commander in December 1855. He commanded the USS Southern Star in the Paraguay expedition. He served as fleet captain of the Mississippi River Squadron from 1862 to 1864.

He was promoted to captain in 1863, to commodore in 1868, and rear admiral in 1872. He retired from the Navy in 1875.

Alexander Mosely Pennock died in Portsmouth, New Hampshire, on September 20, 1876.

References

External links
History of the Portsmouth Naval Shipyard

United States Navy admirals
Union Navy officers
1813 births
1876 deaths